The Calcari ad aptici e Saccocoma Formation, also known as the Saccocoma Formation (known in English as the Haptic limestones and Saccocoma Formation), is a geologic formation in Camponocecchio, Italy that dates back to the Tithonian (152 Ma) - it was first identified in 1976/1980, and was named in 2002. It was probably a marine shale due to the fossil content. Fossils found there include ammonites, cnidarians and the ichthyosaur Gengasaurus, discovered in 1976. Many of the fossils found in this formation are housed at the Spaelaeo-Palaeontologic Museum in Genga.

Paleofauna
Indeterminate ammonites and cnidarians are known from the formation.
Gengasaurus nicosiai
Kobya monteneronensis

References 

Geologic formations of Italy
Geologic formations by lithology
Fossils of Italy
Mesozoic paleontological sites of Europe
Jurassic Italy